Pablo Higueras (born 8 September 1967) is a retired Swiss football midfielder.

References

1967 births
Living people
Swiss people of Spanish descent
Swiss men's footballers
FC Lausanne-Sport players
FC Bulle players
Association football midfielders
Swiss Super League players